Yunak iyesi (Old Turkic: 𐰖𐰆𐰣𐰀𐰚 𐰄𐰖𐰅𐰽𐰄) is the bathhouse (or bathroom) spirit in Turkic mythology. Yunak means bathroom or bathhouse.

In old Turkic culture, especially in rural areas, bathrooms are at a corner of the living room of the house. These are called the Caghlyk (Turkish: Cağlık). But separate bathhouses (called Hammam) were located in larger cities. Every Caghlyk or Hammam had an İye (protector spirit), that called Caghlyk iyesi or Hammam iyesi. If disturbed by an intruder while washing, Yunak iyesi might pour boiling water over him, or even strangle him.

Yunak iyesi had the ability to predict the future. One consulted him by standing with one's back exposed in the half-open door of the bath. He would gently stroke one's back if all boded well; but if trouble lay ahead, he would strike with his claws.

Hammam iyesi
Hammam iyesi was the name of bath spirit in the Turkic mythology. They were akin to the bathhouse spirit Yunak iyesi.

References

External links 
 Tatar Türklerinde Varlıklar, Çulpan Zaripova (Munça İyäse, Hamam İyesi)

İye